Historias is the fifth studio album released on April 19, 1994 by Guatemalan singer-songwriter Ricardo Arjona.

Reception 
The Allmusic review by Jason Birchmeier awarded the album 4.5 stars: "If you were to pick only one Arjona's album for your collection that wasn't a greatest-hits compilation, this should be the one"; he called the album a "career-defining success".

Track listing 
All tracks by Ricardo Arjona

 "Si Yo Fuera" (If I Were) – 4:28
 "Señora de Las Cuatro Décadas" (Lady of The Four Decades) – 5:07
 "Casa de Locos" (Crazy House) – 3:01
 "Historia de Taxi" (Story of a Taxi Driver) – 6:45
 "La Noche Te Trae Sorpresas" (The Night Brings You Surprises) – 4:10
 "Amor de Tele" (Television Love) – 3:18
 "Te Conozco" (I Know You) – 4:11
 "Historia del Portero" (Story of a Doorman) – 5:12
 "Realmente No Estoy Tan Solo" (I'm Really Not That Alone) – 3:51
 "Del Otro Lado del Sol" (The Other Side Of The Sun) – 4:43
 "Me Están Jodiendo La Vida" (They Are Ruining My Life) – 4:28
 "Ayúdame Freud" (Help Me, Freud) – 6:43
 "Libre" (Free) – 3:29
 "Chicos de Plástico" (Plastic Boys) – 4:17

Personnel 

 Susan Ager, Melvin Baer, Norman Davidson, Andrzej Kapica, Diane Kitzman, Delmar Pettys, Mary Reynolds, Gloria Stroud, Peggy Zimmers – violin
 George Anderson – bass
 Mitta Angell, Kay Gardner, Barbara Hustis, Ellen Rose – viola
 Roberto Arballo – arranger, director, acoustic guitar, electric guitar, producer
 Pete Brewer – baritone sax
 Cheryl Cleavenger, Steve Haas, Debi Lee, Elizabeth Meza, Eric Tagg – backing vocals
 Tom Demer  – viola, violin
 Mike Gage  – drums
 Mike Gallagher – electric guitar
 Gene Glover – percussion
 Bud Guin – acoustic guitar
 Eugene Gwozoz – piano
 Ron Jones – soprano & tenor sax
 Randy Lee – clarinet
 Johnnie Marshall  – hammond organ
 David Matthews – oboe
 Mimi McShane – cello
 John Meyers – cello
 Kim Platco  – banjo
 Will Roberts – bassoon
 Jay Saunders – trumpet
 Chuck Schmidt – trumpet
 Miguel Angel "Malin" Villagran – arranger, acoustic guitar
 John Wasson – trombone

Technical personnel 
 Tim Kimsey – engineer
 Carlos Somonte – photography
 Sterling Winfield – assistant engineer

Chart performance

Sales and certifications

See also
1994 in Latin music
 List of best-selling Latin albums

References

External links 
 http://www.ricardoarjona.com/

1994 albums
Ricardo Arjona albums
Sony Discos albums